This is a list of Thai inventions and discoveries.

Biology
 Life cycle of the Gnathostoma spinigerum parasite, by Svasti Daengsvang and Chalerm Prommas (1933)

Medicine
 Molecular basis of alpha thalassemia, by Prawase Wasi and colleagues (1984)
 LIFT technique, the novel treatment of fistula-in-ano, by Arun Rojanasakul (2007)
 Polyethene prosthetic leg invented by Thai Dr. Therdchai Jivacate.

Physics
 The Chachiyo correlation functional for local-density approximation, by Teepanis Chachiyo (2016)

Linguistics
 A new reconstruction of the phonology and lexicon of the Proto-Tai language, by Pittayawat Pittayaporn (2009)

Technology
 Hercules Graphics Card was invented by Van Suwannukul (1982).

See also
Culture of Thailand
Traditional Thai musical instruments

References 

Inventions and discoveries
Thai